Fábio Beretta Rossi, Jr. (born April 18, 1986 in São Paulo) is a racing driver from Brazil.

Beretta began his racing career in 2004 in his domestic Formula Ford 1800  series, finishing 6th in the standings. The following season he moved up to the Brazilian Formula Renault championship with Dragão Motorsport, taking a single podium finish to end the year 13th overall.

In 2006, Beretta moved up to the South American Formula 3 championship with Dragão, taking a podium place at Buenos Aires on his way to 7th place in the championship, with team-mate Luiz Razia winning the title. He stayed in the series for the 2007 season, but switched teams to Bassani Racing. During the year he twice finished on the podium to claim 11th place in the final standings.

For 2008, Beretta moved to Europe to race in the Euroseries 3000 championship, teaming up with Nicolas Prost and Luiz Razia at ELK Motorsport. In the Italian Formula 3000 standings he finished the season in 9th place, whilst in the main Euroseries he currently lies in 7th place with three rounds remaining.

Career results

References

External links
 

1986 births
Living people
Racing drivers from São Paulo
Brazilian racing drivers
Auto GP drivers
Formula 3 Sudamericana drivers
Brazilian Formula Renault 2.0 drivers